Buriti dos Lopes is a municipality in the state of Piauí in the Northeast region of Brazil.

The municipality contains part of the  Serra da Ibiapaba Environmental Protection Area, created in 1996.

See also
List of municipalities in Piauí

References

Municipalities in Piauí